Knowings is a surname. Notable people with the surname include:

 Chris Knowings (born 1980), American actor
 Christy Knowings (born 1980), American actress

See also
 Knowing (disambiguation)